Leonard Herbert Hodges (17 February 1920 – 5 August 1959) was a professional footballer who played in The Football League for Bristol Rovers, Swansea Town (now known as Swansea City), and Reading between 1946 and 1953.

Hodges's entry into professional football was delayed by the Second World War, eventually joining his first professional club and his home town team Bristol Rovers in 1946 when he was aged 26. He scored five goals in each of his four seasons with The Pirates in 118 League games, and later played twice for Swansea Town and six times for Reading, where he was captain of their reserve team. He ended his career with non-League side Chippenham Town, retiring in 1954. He died just five years later, in 1959, at the age of 39 after developing meningitis.

Sources

1920 births
1959 deaths
Footballers from Bristol
English footballers
Association football forwards
Soundwell F.C. players
Bristol Rovers F.C. players
Swansea City A.F.C. players
Reading F.C. players
Chippenham Town F.C. players
Neurological disease deaths in England
Infectious disease deaths in England
Deaths from meningitis
English Football League players